This list of the Mesozoic life of Delaware contains the various prehistoric life-forms whose fossilized remains have been reported from within the US state of Delaware and are between 252.17 and 66 million years of age.

A

  †Acteon
 †Acteon cretacea
 †Acutostrea
 †Acutostrea plumosa
 †Aenona – tentative report
 †Aenona eufaulensis
  †Agerostrea
 †Agerostrea mesenterica
 †Amaurellina
 †Amaurellina stephensoni
 †Ambigostrea
 †Ambigostrea tecticosta
  †Ampullina
 †Ampullina lepta
 †Ampullina lirata
 †Ampullina meekana
 †Anaklinoceras
 †Anaklinoceras reflexum
 †Anaklinoceras tenuicostatum
 †Anchura – tentative report
 †Anisomyon – tentative report
 †Anisomyon borealis
 †Anisomyon jessupi
 †Anomalofusus
 †Anomalofusus substriatus – tentative report
  †Anomia
 †Anomia argentaria
 †Anomia radiata
 †Anomia tellinoides
 †Anomoeodus
 †Anomoeodus phaseolus
 †Aphrodina
 †Aphrodina eufaulensis
 †Aphrodina tippana
  †Apsopelix
 †Apsopelix anglicus
 †Araloselachus
 †Araloselachus cuspidata
  †Arca
 †Arca macnairyensis
  Architectonica – or unidentified comparable form
 †Architectonica voragiformis
 Arrhoges
  Astarte – tentative report
 †Avellana
 †Avellana bullata

B

  †Baculites
 †Baculites haresi
 †Baculites minerensis
 †Baculites ovatus
 †Baculites undatus
 Barbatia
  †Belemnitella
 †Belemnitella americana
 †Bellifusus
 †Bellifusus curvicostatus
 †Belliscala – or unidentified comparable form
 †Belliscala creideri
 †Beretra
 Bernaya
 †Bernaya burlingtonensis
  †Bonnerichthys
 †Bonnerichthys gladius
 †Brachyrhizodus
 †Brachyrhizodus wichitaensis
 †Breviarca
 †Breviarca haddonfieldensis
 †Breviarca richardsi – tentative report
 †Buccinopsis
 †Bulla
 †Bulla macrostromata

C

 Cadulus
 †Cadulus obnutus
 Caestocorbula
 †Caestocorbula crassiplica
 †Calliomphalus
 †Calliomphalus americanus – tentative report
 †Calliomphalus nudus
 †Calliomphalus paucispirilus
 †Camptonectes
 †Camptonectes bellisculptus
 †Camptonectes burlingtonensis
 †Cantharulus – tentative report
  Capulus
 
 †Cardium spillmani
 Caryocorbula
 †Caveola
 †Cenomanocarcinus
 †Cenomanocarcinus robertsi
  Cerithium
 †Cerithium weeksi
 †Chesapeakiceras
 †Chesapeakiceras nodatum – type locality for species
 Clavagella
 †Clavagella armata
  †Clidastes – or unidentified comparable form
 Cliona
 †Clisocolus
 †Coelosaurus
  †Coelosaurus antiquus
  Corbula
 Crassatella
 †Crassatella newkirkensis
 †Crassatella vadosa
 †Crenella
 †Crenella serica
 †Cretodus
 †Cretodus borodini
  †Cretolamna
 †Cretolamna appendiculata
 †Cryptotexanites
 †Cryptotexanites paedomorphicus – type locality for species
 Cucullaea
 †Cucullaea tippana
 †Cucullaea vulgaris
 Cuspidaria
 †Cuspidaria grandis
 Cylichna
 †Cylichna secalina
 †Cylindrocanthus – or unidentified comparable form
 †Cymbophora
 †Cymbophora subtilis
 †Cymella
 †Cymella bella
 †Cymella ironensis
 †Cyprimeria
 †Cyprimeria excavata

D

 †Dentalium
 †Dentalium intercalatum
 †Dentalium subarctuatum
 †Dhondtichlamys – tentative report
 †Dhondtichlamys venustus
  †Didymoceras
 †Didymoceras binodosum
 †Didymoceras cheyennense
 †Didymoceras draconis
 †Didymoceras platycostatum
 †Didymoceras stevensoni
 †Distefania
 †Distefania lauginigeri
 †Drepanochilus
  †Dryptosaurus

E

 †Ecphora – tentative report
 †Ellipsoscapha
 Emarginula
  †Enchodus
 †Enchodus ferox
 †Endoptygma – or unidentified comparable form
 †Endoptygma leprosa
 †Eoacteon
 †Eoacteon percultus
 †Etea
 †Etea carolinensis
 †Eufistulana
 †Eulophoceras – tentative report
 †Euspira
 †Euspira rectilabrum
  †Eutrephoceras
 †Eutrephoceras dekayi
 †Exiteloceras
 †Exiteloceras jenneyi
  †Exogyra
 †Exogyra cancellata
 †Exogyra costata
 †Exogyra ponderosa
 †Exogyra ponderosa erraticostata

G

 Gastrochaena
 †Gegania
 †Gegania bella
 †Gervilliopsis
  Ginglymostoma
 †Ginglymostoma globidens
 †Ginglyostoma
 †Ginglyostoma globidens
   †Globidens
 †Globidens alabamensis
 Glossus
  Glycymeris
 †Glycymeris mortoni
 †Graciliala
 †Graciliala johnsoni
 †Granocardium
 †Granocardium dumosum
 †Granocardium kummeli
 †Granocardium tenuistriatum
 †Gryphaeostrea
 †Gryphaeostrea vomer
 Gyrodes
 †Gyrodes abyssinus
 †Gyrodes americanus – tentative report
 †Gyrodes supraplicatus
 †Gyrodes vetrosus

H

  †Halisaurus
 †Halisaurus platyspondylus
 †Hamulus
 †Hamulus major
 †Hamulus onyx
 †Harduinia
 †Harduinia florealis
 Haustator – or unidentified comparable form
 †Haustator lenolensis
 Hemiaster
 †Hemiaster delawarensis
 †Hemiaster ungula
 †Hercorhyncus
 †Hoploscaphites
 †Hoploscaphites vistulensis
  †Hybodus
 †Hypotodus
 †Hypotodus aculeatus

I

  †Inoceramus
 †Ischyodus
 †Ischyodus bifurcatus
 †Ischyrhiza
 †Ischyrhiza avonicola – or unidentified comparable form
 †Ischyrhiza mira

J

  †Jeletzkytes
 †Jeletzkytes compressus
 Juliacorbula – or unidentified comparable form
 †Juliacorbula swedesboroensis

L

 †Latiala – or unidentified comparable form
 †Latiala lobata
 †Laxispira
 †Laxispira lumbricalis
 †Laxispira monilifera
 †Legumen
 †Legumen concentricum
 †Legumen ellipticum – tentative report
 †Legumen planulatum
  Lepisosteus – or unidentified comparable form
 †Leptosolen
 †Leptosolen biplicata
 Lima
 †Lima lorillardensis
 †Linearis
 †Linearis contracta
 †Linearis magnoliensis
 †Linearis metastriata
 †Lingula – tentative report
 †Liopistha
 †Liopistha alternata – tentative report
 †Liopistha protexta
  †Lissodus
 †Lissodus babulskii
  Lithophaga
 †Lithophaga julia
 †Longoconcha
  Lopha
 †Lopha falcata
 †Lucina
 †Lyriochlamys – or unidentified comparable form
 Malletia
 †Malletia longifrons
 †Malletia protexta – tentative report
 †Malletia stephensoni
 †Margaritella
 Martesia
 †Mathilda
 †Menabites
 †Menabites delawarensis
 †Menabites vanuxemi
 †Menuites
 †Menuites portlocki
 †Micrabacia
 †Micrabacia marylandica
 †Morea – or unidentified comparable form
 †Morea marylandica

N

 †Napulus
 †Napulus reesidei
 †Neithea
 †Neithea quinquecostata
 †Nemocardium
 †Nemocardium parahillanum
 †Nemodon
 †Nemodon eufaulensis
 †Nonactaeonina
 †Notoceras
 †Notoceras monotuberculatum
   Nucula
 †Nucula percrassa
 †Nucula whitfieldi – tentative report
 Nuculana
 †Nuculana compressifrons
 †Nuculana marlboroensis
 †Nuculano
 †Nuculano stephensani
 †Nudivagus
 †Nymphalucina
 †Nymphalucina parva

O

  Odontaspis
 †Odontaspis macrota
 †Odontaspis sahammeri
 †Odontaspis samhammeri
 †Ornithomimus
 †Ornithomimus antique
 †Ornopsis – or unidentified comparable form
 †Ornopsis digressa
 Ostrea

P

  †Pachydiscus
  †Pachymelania
 †Paladmete
 †Paladmete cancellaria
 †Paladmete gardnerae
 †Palaeocypraea
 †Palaeocypraea grooti – type locality for species
 Panopea
 †Panopea decisa
 †Paralbula
 †Paralbula casei
 † Paranomia
 †Paranomia scabra
 †Paranomotodon
 †Paranomotodon agustidens
 †Paranomotodon angustidens
 †Parietiplicatum – or unidentified comparable form
 †Parietiplicatum conicum
 †Parmicorbula
 †Parmicorbula bisulcata
 Patella
 †Patella tentorium
  †Pecten
 Pholadomya
 †Pholadomya occidentalis
 Pholas – tentative report
 †Pinna
 †Pinna laqueata
  †Placenticeras
 †Placenticeras placenta
 †Placenticeras syrtale
 †Pleuriocardia – or unidentified related form
 †Pleuriocardia donohuensis
 †Pleurocardia – tentative report
 †Pleurocardia uniformis
 †Plicatolamna
 †Plicatolamna arcuata
 Plicatula
 †Plicatula mullicaensis
 †Postligata
 †Postligata crenata
 †Postligata wordeni
  †Pseudocorax
 †Pseudocorax granti
 †Pseudohypolophus
 †Pseudolimea
 †Pseudolimea kerri
 †Pseudolimea reticulata
 Pseudomalaxis
 †Pseudoschloenbachia
 †Pseudoschloenbachia chispaensis – or unidentified comparable form
  †Pteranodon – tentative report
 †Pteria
 †Pterocerella – or unidentified comparable form
 †Pterocerella poinsettiformis
 †Pterotrigonia
 †Pterotrigonia bartrami
 †Pterotrigonia eufaulensis
 †Pterotrigonia thoracia
 †Ptychotrygon
 †Ptychotrygon vermiculata
 Pycnodonte
 †Pycnodonte mutabilis
 †Pygurostoma
 †Pygurostoma geometricum
 †Pyrifusus
 †Pyrifusus sinuocostatus
 †Pyropsis
 †Pyropsis perlata

R

 †Radiopecten
 †Radiopecten mississippiensis
 †Remera – tentative report
 Rhinobatos
 †Rhinobatos casieri
  †Rhombodus
 †Rhombodus laevis
 Ringicula
 †Ripleyella

S

 †Sargana
 †Scambula
 †Scambula perplana
  †Scapanorhynchus
 †Scapanorhynchus texanus
  †Scaphites
 †Scaphites hippocrepis
 †Sclerorhynchus
 Serpula
 †Solenoceras
 †Solenoceras annulifer
 †Sourimis – or unidentified comparable form
 †Sourimis georgiana
 †Spiroxybeloceras
 †Spiroxybeloceras meekanum
 Spondylus
  Squalicorax
 †Squalicorax falcatus
 †Squalicorax kaupi
 †Squalicorax pristodontus
 Squatina
 †Squatina hassei
 †Stephanodus
 †Submortoniceras
 †Submortoniceras punctatum
 †Submortoniceras uddeni
 †Syncyclonema
 †Syncyclonema conradi
 †Syncyclonema simplicius
 †Synodontaspis
 †Synodontaspis holmdelensis

T

 Tellina
 †Tenea
 Terebratulina
 †Terebratulina cooperi
 †Texanites
 †Tintorium – tentative report
  †Toxochelys
  Trachycardium
 †Trachycardium eufaulensis
 †Trachycardium longstreeti – tentative report
 †Trigonia
 Trionyx
 †Trionyx halophilus – type locality for species
 †Tundora – or unidentified comparable form
 †Tundora tuberculata
 Turritella
 †Turritella lorillardensis
 †Turritella macnairyensis
 †Turritella marshalltownensis
 †Turritella merchantvillensis
 †Turritella quadrilira
 †Turritella tippana
 †Turritella trilira
 †Turritella vertebroides
  †Tylosaurus
 Tympanotonos – or unidentified comparable form
 †Tympanotonos cretacea

U

 †Unicardium – or unidentified comparable form
 †Unicardium umbonatum
 †Urceolabrum
 †Urceolabrum mantachieensis – tentative report

V

 †Veniella
 †Veniella conradi
 †Vetericardiella
 †Vetericardiella subcircula
 †Volutomorpha

W

 †Wadeopsamea – tentative report
 †Weeksia
 †Woodsella
 †Woodsella typica

X

 Xenophora
  †Xiphactinus

References
 

Mesozoic
Delaware